In Scotland and northern England, a Linn is a geographical water feature, a watercourse that has cut through a shelf of hard rock creating a narrow (usually), steep-sided crevice (fracture) through which it runs.

Typically one named after a river or area can have application even for more than one such feature.

The photograph of the Linn of Dee illustrates the attributes of a typical 'Linn'.

In Gordon (1925) the author describing a walk down Glen Avon in the Cairngorms mentions two Linns on the River Avon - first:

A linn may also refer to a waterfall or a pool at the foot of a waterfall, with the derivation a confusion of Scots Gaelic linne (pool) and Old English  (torrent).

Sources

References
Gazetteer for Scotland "Glossary:L". Retrieved 2 January 2008.
England's Rock Art - Roughting Linn, Northumberland

Notes: 

Fluvial landforms
Geography of Scotland
Geography of England